Marie-Josée Fortin  (born October 21, 1958) is an ecologist and Professor in the Department of Ecology and Evolutionary Biology at the University of Toronto. Fortin holds the Tier 1 Canada Research Chair in Spatial Ecology at the University of Toronto. In 2016, she was elected as a Fellow of the Royal Society of Canada.

Education and career 
Fortin completed her BSc (1983) and her MSc (1986) at the Université de Montréal. In 1992 she received a PhD from the Stony Brook University, where she was Robert Sokal's last doctoral student. She then went on to do a Postdoctoral Fellowship (1992-1994) at Université Laval.

Fortin focuses her current research on four subject areas: spatial ecology, spatial and landscape statistics, conservation, as well as disturbance ecology.  These subjects include disciplines such as spatially-explicit modeling, spatial epidemiology, forest ecology, network theory, landscape genetics and geography. This research focuses on the maintenance of biodiversity within ecosystems and appropriate conservation strategies for species affected by land use and climate change. This includes the analyses of how environmental factors and ecological processes affect the movement, persistence, and range dynamics of species at the landscape and geographical range in both forested and aquatic environments.

Publications 
Since 1987, Fortin has contributed to a large number of publications in books as well as scientific journals involving ecology and conservation. This includes over 160 peer-reviewed papers and the co-authoring of the book Spatial Analysis: A Guide for Ecologists, which included the 1st and 2nd editions published in 2005 and 2014.

Select awards and honours 
 2016 – Fellow of the Royal Society of Canada
 2015: Outstanding Scientific Achievements Award from the International Association for Landscape Ecology.
 2014 – ISI Highly Cited Researcher in Ecology/Environment, Thomson Reuters
 2013: Distinguished Landscape Ecologist Award (US Regional Association of the International Association for Landscape Ecology).
 2002-2007: Premier's Research Excellence Award, Ontario (PREA).
 2002–2007, 2009, 2010, 2012–2014, 2016, 2017: Dean's Excellence Award, Faculty Arts and Science, University of Toronto.
2001: Women in Geomatics Mentor Award. GEOIDE 3rd Annual Meeting, Fredericton.

References

Canada Research Chairs
Canadian ecologists
Women ecologists
Fellows of the Royal Society of Canada
Living people
Academic staff of the University of Toronto
Université de Montréal alumni
1958 births
21st-century Canadian women scientists
Stony Brook University alumni
Academic staff of the Université de Sherbrooke
Academic staff of the Université de Montréal
Academic staff of Simon Fraser University
Mathematical ecologists
Spatial statisticians